Chak Tok Ichʼaak II, also known as Jaguar Paw II and Jaguar Paw Skull (died 24 July 508), was an ajaw of the Maya city of Tikal. He took the throne  and reigned until his death. He was son of Kʼan Chitam and Lady Tzutz Nik. The monuments associated with Chak Tok Ichʼaak II are Stelae 3, 7, 15, 21, and possibly 26.

Notes

Footnotes

References

Rulers of Tikal
5th century in the Maya civilization
6th century in the Maya civilization
5th-century monarchs in North America
6th-century monarchs in North America
Date of birth unknown
508 deaths